František Skladaný (born April 22, 1982) is a Slovak professional ice hockey player currently an unrestricted free agent. He most recently played with Vlci Žilina in the Slovak 1. Liga (SVK.1). He was selected by the Colorado Avalanche in the fifth-round (143rd overall) of the 2001 NHL Entry Draft.

Skladany has played with HC Karlovy Vary of the Czech Extraliga from the 2006–07 season. On October 20, 2012, he was signed to a one-year contract extension to remain in Karlovy until 2013.

On July 21, 2013, Skaldany signed a one-year contract as a free agent with Russian Higher Hockey League club, Buran Voronezh, an affiliate of HC Spartak Moscow.

Career statistics

Regular season and playoffs

International

References

External links

1982 births
Living people
Sportspeople from Martin, Slovakia
Boston University Terriers men's ice hockey players
Colorado Avalanche draft picks
Hershey Bears players
HC Karlovy Vary players
Lowell Lock Monsters players
MHC Martin players
HC Olomouc players
Quad City Mallards (UHL) players
San Diego Gulls (ECHL) players
Slovak ice hockey right wingers
Slovak expatriate ice hockey players in the United States
Slovak expatriate ice hockey players in the Czech Republic
Slovak expatriate ice hockey players in Russia
Expatriate ice hockey players in Belarus
Slovak expatriate sportspeople in Belarus